Emma Little-Pengelly (born 31 December 1979) is a Northern Irish barrister and Democratic Unionist Party (DUP) politician. She has been a Member of the Legislative Assembly (MLA) for Lagan Valley since 12 May 2022 when she was co-opted to replace DUP party leader Sir Jeffrey Donaldson who declined to take up his seat after being elected at the 2022 Northern Ireland Assembly election to remain in the House of Commons. She previously served as the Member of Parliament (MP) for the Belfast South constituency in the House of Commons of the United Kingdom from 2017 until 2019, when she lost her seat to Claire Hanna of the SDLP, and as an MLA for the Belfast South constituency in the Northern Ireland Assembly.

Early life and career

Little-Pengelly is the daughter of Maureen Elizabeth Little and the loyalist Noel Little. He was absent from her childhood between the ages of nine and eleven, following his arrest in Paris.

Little-Pengelly was educated at Markethill High School, Portadown College and Queen's University Belfast. She qualified as a barrister in 2003. She was also a tutor and lectured at the University of Ulster from 2004 to 2006.

Political career

Little-Pengelly began her political career in 2007 as Special Advisor (Spad) to the Reverend Ian Paisley, while he was in the office of First Minister, where she worked as part of the DUP talks team with victims of the Troubles. Little-Pengelly remained in the position of Special Advisor when Peter Robinson assumed the office of First Minister in 2008 until 2015 after over 8 years in the position.

Little-Pengelly succeeded Jimmy Spratt as MLA for Belfast South in the Northern Ireland Assembly in 2015, following his retirement due to ill health. On 28 October 2015, Little-Pengelly was appointed as a junior minister in the Northern Ireland Executive Office. Little-Pengelly ran in the 2016 Assembly Election in the South Belfast constituency and was elected. She was appointed Chairperson of the Finance Committee following this election.

She lost her seat at the 2017 Northern Ireland Assembly election, as the total number of seats in Belfast South was reduced from 6 to 5, trailing her running mate Christopher Stalford by 15 votes at the time of her elimination.

At the 2017 UK general election, Little-Pengelly became the MP for Belfast South, gaining the seat from the SDLP's Alasdair McDonnell. The former Northern Ireland First Minister Peter Robinson was the chief strategist behind Little-Pengelly's campaign.
She subsequently lost the seat to the SDLP's Claire Hanna at the 2019 general election.

On 12 May 2022, one week after the Northern Ireland Assembly election, DUP leader Jeffrey Donaldson refused to take his seat in Stormont due to his opposition to the Northern Ireland Protocol. Little-Pengelly was co-opted to replace him, saying, "I have agreed to fill [Donaldson's] seat in Lagan Valley at this time both to support this work and to ensure a continued high level of support and service to the constituents of Lagan Valley. It is a privilege to be asked to fulfil this role at this important time for unionism and for Northern Ireland. While Sir Jeffrey focuses on that immediate task, I look forward to serving the people of Lagan Valley with passion and commitment."

Personal life

Little-Pengelly is married to Richard Pengelly, CB, who is the Permanent Secretary at the Department of Justice in Northern Ireland. She has three stepchildren from Pengelly's first marriage.

References

External links

1979 births
Living people
British female MPs
Alumni of Queen's University Belfast
Barristers from Northern Ireland
UK MPs 2017–2019
Democratic Unionist Party MPs
Members of the Parliament of the United Kingdom for Belfast constituencies (since 1922)
Junior ministers of the Northern Ireland Assembly (since 1999)
Democratic Unionist Party MLAs
Northern Ireland MLAs 2011–2016
Northern Ireland MLAs 2016–2017
Academics of Ulster University
Harvard Kennedy School alumni
Female members of the Northern Ireland Assembly
Female members of the Parliament of the United Kingdom for Northern Irish constituencies
Women lawyers from Northern Ireland
People educated at Markethill High School
21st-century women politicians from Northern Ireland
Northern Ireland MLAs 2022–2027